René Taliti Kobuyama-Amabuyok (born 10 July 1923, date of death unknown) was a Filipino swimmer. He competed in the men's 200 metre breaststroke at the 1948 Summer Olympics.

References

External links
 

1923 births
Year of death missing
Sportspeople from Zamboanga City
Filipino male swimmers
Olympic swimmers of the Philippines
Swimmers at the 1948 Summer Olympics
Place of birth missing
Asian Games medalists in swimming
Asian Games bronze medalists for the Philippines
Swimmers at the 1951 Asian Games
Medalists at the 1951 Asian Games
Male breaststroke swimmers
20th-century Filipino people